Patrick Desmond Lehane (died 1 July 1976) was an Irish politician. A farmer by profession, he was an unsuccessful candidate at the 1943 and 1944 general elections for the Cork South-East constituency. He elected to Dáil Éireann at the 1948 general election as a Clann na Talmhan Teachta Dála (TD) for the Cork South constituency. He was re-elected at the 1951 general election as an independent TD but lost his seat at the 1954 general election.

References

Year of birth missing
1976 deaths
Clann na Talmhan TDs
Independent TDs
Members of the 13th Dáil
Members of the 14th Dáil
Politicians from County Cork
Irish farmers